The 2013 FIRS Intercontinental Cup was the 14th edition of the roller hockey tournament known as the Intercontinental Cup, played on 16 November 2013 at the Palácio dos Desportos de Torres Novas, in Torres Novas, Portugal. SL Benfica (winner of the 2012–13 CERH European League) won the cup for the first time, defeating Sport Recife (winner of the 2012 CSP South American Club Championship).

Match

References

See also
FIRS Intercontinental Cup

FIRS Intercontinental Cup
FIRS Intercontinental Cup
2013 in roller hockey
International roller hockey competitions hosted by Portugal